Asmus Ehrenreich von Bredow (29 April 1693 in Senzke (Landkreis Westhavelland)–15 February 1756 in Halberstadt) was a Prussian Lieutenant General and Governor of the fortress at Kolberg.  He served in the War of Austrian Succession in Frederick the Great's army.  He was a Knight of the Black Eagle Order, hereditary heir of Worin’schen properties in East Prussia, and his name is listed on the Equestrian statue of Frederick the Great in Berlin.

References

1693 births
1756 deaths
Lieutenant generals of Prussia
Military personnel from Brandenburg